Private Eyes is the tenth studio album by American pop rock duo Hall & Oates, released on September 1, 1981, by RCA Records. The album includes two number-one singles—the title track and "I Can't Go for That (No Can Do)", as well as the top-10 single "Did It in a Minute". "I Can't Go for That (No Can Do)" also spent a week at the top of the R&B chart.

Background and writing
Though Daryl Hall & John Oates had reached the upper reaches of the Billboard charts with "She's Gone", "Sara Smile", and "Rich Girl", the duo did not return to major mainstream success until they released a cover version of the Righteous Brothers' "You've Lost That Lovin' Feelin'" on their 1980 album, Voices. The heavy airplay eventually led to the duo's first number-one single in four years, the Voices release, "Kiss on My List" in early 1981.

As the liner notes to the 2004 Private Eyes reissue indicate, it was while Daryl Hall & John Oates were recording the follow-up album in their adopted hometown of New York City, during the spring of 1981, that "Kiss on My List" reached number one in three trade publications. Determined to follow up on their success, the duo produced Private Eyes assisted by their co-producer Neil Kernon.

Singles and notable songs
The following singles were released from the album, with the highest charting positions listed.

The title track of Private Eyes builds on the punchy sound of "Kiss on My List". The handclap chorus and vocal/keyboard hooks of the recording were augmented by the promotional video, featuring the band wearing detective garb (trench coats, fedoras, and suits). It was one of the duo's earliest hit videos on MTV.

While the "Private Eyes" tune remains a rock-and-soul signature of the duo, its huge success was eclipsed by the second single from the Private Eyes album—"I Can't Go for That (No Can Do)", released in December 1981 before the start of the Christmas season. It topped the pop, R&B and dance charts. It remains one of the few songs by a white act to top both pop and R&B, and among the most heavily sampled songs in the history of hip hop (for a list of acts who've covered/quoted from it, see the entry for the song).

The other charted songs from the Private Eyes album include the Top 40 hit "Your Imagination", and "Did It in a Minute", a top ten hit with a similar rhythm to "Private Eyes" and "Kiss on My List".

Among the other entries on the album is "Looking for a Good Sign", which the duo (in the original liner notes) dedicates to the original lineup of The Temptations, a major influence on Hall and Oates. The duo would eventually perform with classic Tempts vocalists David Ruffin and Eddie Kendrick at Live Aid and on their Live at the Apollo album in 1985. According to American Songwriter, Daryl Hall states: "'Looking for a Good Sign' was one of the few songs in my life that I actually dreamed. I woke up in the morning and ran to the tape recorder and sang my dream into the tape recorder and got that. It's great... it's a dream song." Hall & Oates also sang with The Temptations at their Rock and Roll Hall of Fame induction ceremony.

Hall & Oates' biggest success would come the following year with the album H2O, but many critics term Private Eyes as their creative and cultural peak, not only for its artistic and commercial success but for its influence.

Track listing

Personnel 
 Daryl Hall – lead vocals , backing vocals, keyboards, synthesizers, mandar guitar, mandola, mandocello, timbales, CompuRhythm drum machine
 John Oates – lead vocals , backing vocals, guitar, mando-guitar, keyboards
 Larry Fast – synthesizer, programming
 G.E. Smith – lead guitar, guitar solos
 Ray Gomez – lead guitar 
 Jeff Southworth – guitar solo 
 John Siegler – bass 
 Mickey Curry – drums 
 Jerry Marotta – drums 
 Chuck Burgi – drums 
 Jimmy Maelen – percussion
 Charles DeChant – saxophone
 John Jarett – additional backing vocals

Production 
 Produced by Daryl Hall, John Oates and Neil Kernon.
 Engineered and Mixed by Neil Kernon
 Assistant Engineer – Bruce Buchalter
 Recorded at Electric Lady Studios (New York, NY).
 Art Direction, Design and Cover Photo – Ed Caraeff
 Inner Sleeve Photo – Lynn Goldsmith
 Management and Direction – Tommy Mottola
 Equipment Technician – Mike Klvana

Charts

Weekly charts

Year-end charts

Certifications

References

1981 albums
Albums produced by Neil Kernon
Dance-rock albums
Hall & Oates albums
RCA Records albums
Albums recorded at Electric Lady Studios